Stan Kenton Band Clinics were summer programs founded by Stan Kenton in 1959.  Kenton conceived the idea out of concern that education of jazz and all its forms were not reaching teenagers who showed signs of interest in it.  He strongly felt that the survival of jazz depended heavily on the ability of leaders and artists in jazz community to educate a younger generation.

Development of the Clinics
Dr. Gene Hall and Leon Breeden, both of North Texas State University, played a major role in helping Kenton develop the clinics.

The first clinic was in 1959, held at Indiana University under the auspices of the National Stage Band Camp.  Struck by the serious responsibility and encouraged by his first camp, Kenton, in 1960, sent a trunk load of original big band scores culled from his library to North Texas for use as teaching aids.  We definitely have a serious responsibility that must be dealt with.

In 1961, two Kenton added two locations, one at Michigan State University and one at Southern Methodist University.  Clinicians, Kenton included, received no salary, only room and board. In the beginning the Kenton Band would play dances and concerts in the nearby area each night of the clinic. By the late 60s the band members themselves became a more integral part of the day to day experience of the clinics.

In 1967, Kenton separated his activities from the National Stage Band Camp, renaming it the Stan Kenton Band Clinics. The first clinics (the word camp was abandoned as being not academic enough) were held at University of Redlands and San Jose State University with faculty that included Henry Mancini, Shelly Manne, Pete Rugolo, Bill Holman, Bill Perkins and Bud Shank. In the 1970s Hank Levy, Ken Hanna, Lou Marini, Tom Ferguson and Dan Haerle were among the faculty.

By 1975, Kenton was conducting over 100 clinics a year, as well as four week-long summer clinics on college campuses. At this time he was also distributing various educational materials and stage-band charts, as well as his own albums, with his Creative World company.

Select Former Students

 Bob Curnow
 Randy Brecker
 Peter Erskine (1961, age 11)
Tim Hagans
 Keith Jarrett
 John LaPorta
 Lyle Mays
 Jim McNeely
 Kye Palmer
 Jim Price
 David Sanborn
 Shawn Pelton
 Dave Weckl
 Steve Smith
 Mike Vax
 Jim Widner
 Billy Zoom-1963
 Gary Burton - 1960
 Gordon Goodwin - 1970

Clinicians
EARLY CLINICIANS

 Dr. M.E. "Gene" Hall
 Leon Breeden
 Clem DeRosa
 Sam Donahue
 John LaPorta
 Johnny Richards
 Eddie Safranski
 Sal Salvador

OTHER CLINICIANS

 Buddy Baker
 Ray Brown
 Bob Curnow
 Buddy Morrow
 Art Van Damme
Tom Ferguson
 Don Jacoby
 Bob Seibert (arranger, composer)
 Buddy DeFranco
 Peter Erskine
 Jack Petersen
 Rich Matteson
 Hal Sherman
 Mark Taylor
 Mike Vax
 Conte Candoli
 Donald Byrd

See also
 Stan Kenton
 Jazz education

Notes and references

External links
 Essay by Stan Kenton about the Clinics

Jazz music education
Music education in the United States